Aghan (also Romanized as Āghān; also known as Āghūn) is a village in Pol Beh Pain Rural District, Simakan District, Jahrom County, Fars Province, Iran. At the 2006 census, its population was 555, in 121 families.

References 

Populated places in Jahrom County